Ernesto "Chico" Escárrega (born December 27, 1949) is a Mexican former Major League Baseball pitcher who played for the Chicago White Sox in their 1982 season.

Baseball career
Escárrega was signed as an undrafted free agent by the Chicago White Sox.

Escárrega entered major league baseball in 1982, as a 32-year-old rookie, the year that future Hall-of-Famer Cal Ripken Jr. ended up winning the AL rookie of the year title. Pitching primarily in relief, he went 1-3 in 73.2 innings with a 3.67 ERA, 33 strikeouts and a WHIP of 1.21.

Escárrega retired the year after his rookie season, before the start of the next season in early 1983, at the age of 33, along with four other White Sox teammates, including Sparky Lyle.

References
, or Baseball Almanac, or Retrosheet

1949 births
Living people
Acereros de Monclova players
Algodoneros de Unión Laguna players
Angeles de Puebla players
Baseball players from Sinaloa
Chicago White Sox players
Diablos Rojos del México players
Edmonton Trappers players
Ganaderos de Tabasco players
Leones de Yucatán players
Major League Baseball pitchers
Major League Baseball players from Mexico
Mexican Baseball Hall of Fame inductees
Mexican expatriate baseball players in Canada
Mexican expatriate baseball players in the United States
Mexican League baseball pitchers
Pericos de Puebla players
Piratas de Campeche players
Rieleros de Aguascalientes players
Sportspeople from Los Mochis